Volkan Eğri (born 2 April 1998) is a professional footballer who plays as a left winger. Born in Germany, he is a youth international for Turkey.

Club career
A youth product of the German clubs Darmstadt 98 and Eintracht Frankfurt, Eğri signed his first professional contract with Sivasspor on 16 August 2019. He made his professional debut with Sivasspor in a 2–2 Süper Lig tie with Gençlerbirliği on 22 December 2019. He went on loan to the Bosnian club Čelik Zenica in January 2020, and followed that with a loan to Sivas Belediyespor on 6 October 2020.

International career
Born in Germany, Eğri is of Turkish descent. He represented the Turkey U18s in 2015.

Honours
Sivasspor
 Turkish Cup: 2021–22

References

External links

Volkan Eğri at datencenter

1998 births
Sportspeople from Darmstadt
German people of Turkish descent
Living people
Turkish footballers
Turkey youth international footballers
German footballers
Association football midfielders
TFF Second League players
Sivasspor footballers
NK Čelik Zenica players
Tuzlaspor players
Süper Lig players
Premier League of Bosnia and Herzegovina players
Turkish expatriate footballers
German expatriate footballers
Turkish expatriate sportspeople in Bosnia and Herzegovina
German expatriate sportspeople in Bosnia and Herzegovina
Expatriate footballers in Bosnia and Herzegovina